The S11 district lies within in the City of Sheffield, South Yorkshire, England.  The district contains 97 listed buildings that are recorded in the National Heritage List for England.  Of these, seven are listed at Grade II*, the middle grade, and the others are at Grade II, the lowest grade.  The district is in the south west of the city of Sheffield, and covers the areas of Banner Cross, Bents Green, Ecclesall, Ecclesall Road, Endcliffe, Greystones, Hunter's Bar, Sharrow Vale, Parkhead, Ringinglow and Whirlow, plus parts of Millhouses and Nether Edge.

For neighbouring areas, see listed buildings in Sheffield City Centre, listed buildings in S2, listed buildings in S3, listed buildings in S7, listed buildings in S10, listed buildings in S17, listed buildings in Grindleford and listed buildings in Hathersage.



Key

Buildings

References 

 - A list of all the listed buildings within Sheffield City Council's boundary is available to download from this page.

Sources

 S11
Sheffield S11